The smc Pentax-D FA 645 25mm F4 AL (IF) SDM AW is an interchangeable camera lens for the Pentax 645 medium format system.

References
Pentax smc D FA 645 25mm F4 AL (IF) SDM AW: Digital Photography Review

025